Sutisna (born 15 November 1976), more commonly known as Sule, is an Indonesian comedian and actor. He became well-known after winning the Indonesian comedian audition show API (Audisi Pelawak Indonesia) with Ogi Suwarna and Obin Wahyudin in the group SOS in 2005.

In 2013, Sule collaborated with Korean singer Eru in a multi-lingual music video titled "Saranghaeyo".

Personal life 
Sule was married to Lina Jubaedah from 1997 until 2018. He was married again to Nathalie Holscher and divorced on 10 August 2022.

Filmography

Films

Television films 
 Dadang Dudung
 Dadang Dudung 2
 Sule Love Mimin
 When Sule meet Sulis
 Steven Cau I Love You
 Steven Cau I Love You 2

Television 
 Saung SOS
 Komedi Putar on TPI
 Opera Van Java on Trans 7
 PAS Mantab on Trans 7
 Awas Ada Sule on Global TV
 Awas Ada Sule 2 on Global TV
 Untung Ada Sule on Global TV
 Oesman 77 on Trans 7
 Siang Seru Sama Sule on Global TV
 Kata Bergaya on Antv
 Ini Talkshow on NET.
 Bukan Sekedar Wayang (voice) on NET.
 Ini Sahur on NET.
 Comedy Night Live (Alkisah) on NET.
 Sahurnya Pesbukers on antv
 Awas Ada Sule Lagi on GTV Santuy Malam on Trans TV Kontes Dangdut Indonesia 2020 on MNC TV Cerita Cinta Sule on Trans TV Rumah Seleb on MNC TV''

Awards

Panasonic Gobel Awards

Nickelodeon Indonesia Kids' Choice Awards

Bright Awards Indonesia

References 

1976 births
Living people
21st-century comedians
Indonesian male comedians
Indonesian comedians
Indonesian male film actors
Indonesian male television actors
People from Cimahi
Sundanese people